Michael Floud Blaney, GC (14 November 1910 – 13 December 1940), known as Max Blaney, was posthumously awarded the George Cross for defusing enemy bombs during the Blitz in 1940.

Second World War
Blaney, a member of the Corps of Royal Engineers, dismantled several bombs on 18 September, 20 October and 13 December 1940. During the last incident he was killed, aged 30, when the bomb he was defusing exploded in Manor Park, Essex.

George Cross citation
Notice of Blaney's George Cross appeared in the London Gazette on 15 April 1941:

In December 2013 an Ulster History Circle blue plaque was unveiled in his memory in Newry.

Footnotes

Further reading

External links
George Cross database
Details of Blaney's heroic act which won him the posthumous George Cross

1910 births
1940 deaths
Deaths by airstrike during World War II
British recipients of the George Cross
British Army personnel killed in World War II
Royal Engineers officers
People from Newry
Bomb disposal personnel
Military personnel from Newry